Yashar Aliyev is an Azerbaijani freestyle wrestler.

Aliyev won a bronze medal at the 2013 European Wrestling Championships in Tbilisi.

References

Year of birth missing (living people)
Living people
Azerbaijani male sport wrestlers
European Wrestling Championships medalists
21st-century Azerbaijani people